Pithoragarh  Fort is a fort in Pithoragarh in the Indian state of Uttarakhand. It was built during Chand period by regional ruler Peeru Alias Prithwi Gusain. According to some records, this fort was constructed by the Gorkhas in the year 1789, after invading the town. The Pithoragarh Fort is situated on a hill on the outskirts of the town of Pithoragarh. At present, the fort is in dilapidated condition.

References 
   

Forts in Uttarakhand
Pithoragarh district